Anathallis imberbis is a species of orchid plant native to Bolivia, Brazil, Ecuador, Venezuela.

References 

imberbis
Flora of Bolivia
Flora of Brazil
Flora of Ecuador
Flora of Venezuela